Uchikoshi (written: 打越) is a Japanese surname. Notable people with the surname include:

, Japanese video game director and scenario writer
, Japanese long-distance runner
, Japanese footballer

Japanese-language surnames